Petar Vujačić (born January 19, 2000) is a Slovenian professional basketball player for Mornar of the ABA League and the Montenegrin League.

Professional career
Vujačić started playing professional basketball for Rogaška in 2017. After one year he signed a four-year-contract with Olimpija.

On June 23, 2022, he has signed with Mornar of the ABA League and the Montenegrin League.

Personal life 
His step-brother Saša Vujačić is also a professional basketball player who used to play in the NBA.

References

External links
 ABA League profile
 RealGM profile

2000 births
Living people
KK Cedevita Olimpija players
KK Olimpija players
Shooting guards
Slovenian men's basketball players
Slovenian people of Serbian descent
Sportspeople from Maribor